Craobh Haven  is a small purpose-built village and sailing port on the west coast of Argyll and Bute, Scotland.

Craobh Haven was built in 1983 as a holiday resort village and marina. Glasgow-based architects Gillespie, Kidd & Coia were involved in the early stages of the project, but were replaced before the construction of the buildings. The large, safe water marina was formed by the building of causeways and a large breakwater between a small group of tidal saltwater islands. The village has one public house, called "The Lord of The Isles", a village store, as well as a harbourmaster and marina office. A watersports centre, together with holiday accommodation, is located on Eilean Buidhe, one of the small islands surrounding the marina. Within the village, there are two small terraces of houses, a group of small cottages, the majority of which are used as holiday rentals, and several small cottages and larger houses scattered around the outer edges and the hillside above the village.

The enclosed marina is very popular with private boat owners, but does not have anchorage for larger passenger vessels. There are occasional visits to the village by small cruise ships, touring the nearby islands, which land passengers by their ships boats to awaiting coaches, for sight-seeing trips ashore.

The waters to the north of Craobh Haven are part of the Firth of Lorne, and the village overlooks the Slate Islands, with Shuna being the closest.

Sailing
The waters surrounding the islands are extensively used for leisure sailing areas. A good knowledge of the area is required, with weather conditions likely to change very quickly. Due to the array of separate tidal races produced by the underwater topography there are some treacherous stretches of water. These include the 'Grey Dogs' and the Gulf of Corryvreckan, in which is located the infamous Corryvreckan whirlpool, which is the third largest whirlpool in the world.

Recreational diving

The Garvellachs are particularly well known to divers, with boats from Oban also taking groups down to the area. Increasingly many divers are basing their activities from Craobh Haven itself.  The waters, though somewhat devoid of fish, offer some very clear waters and an extensive array of corals, seastars, anemone, shellfish and underwater topographical features. The trips out to the dive sites also offer the opportunities to see golden eagles, sea eagles and porpoises.  Due to the fast flowing waters in the Firth of Lorne minke whales may also be viewed occasionally.

References
 Walker, Frank Arneil The Buildings of Scotland: Argyll and Bute, Penguin, 2000

External links

 Watson, Jeremy, "Sink or swim for whirlpool daredevils" Scotland On Sunday, 24 Aug 2003 

Craobh Haven
Marinas in Scotland
1983 establishments in Scotland
Populated places established in 1983